The Congress of Estonia (Estonian: Eesti Kongress) was an innovative grassroots parliament established in Estonia in 1990–1992 as a part of the process of regaining of independence from the Soviet Union. It also challenged the power and authority of the pre-existing quasi-parliament in the country, called the Supreme Soviet of the Estonian SSR, which had been imposed on Estonia after the Soviet invasion, occupation and illegal annexation of Estonia in 1940. The Congress of Estonia declared that it represented the highest authority on questions of Estonian statehood and citizenship, deriving this authority from the consent and initiative of the citizens of Estonia. The aim of the Congress was to restore Estonian independence based on the principle of legal continuity, with the pre-1940 Republic of Estonia, which had been established in 1918, as the foundation.

Activity 
In 1989, independence activists formed a mass movement called the Estonian Citizens' Committees and started registering persons who were Estonian citizens by birth according to the jus sanguinis principle, i.e., persons who held Estonian citizenship in June 1940 (at which point Estonia's de facto structures of state were systematically dismantled and reorganized, after the country had been occupied by the Soviet Union), and their descendants.  People who did not satisfy these criteria were invited to file applications for citizenship.  By February 1990, 790,000 citizens and about 60,000 applicants had been registered.

In February 1990, the election of a body of representatives of these citizens – the Congress of Estonia – was conducted by those who had been registered.  The Congress had 499 delegates from 31 political parties.  The Estonian National Independence Party (usually abbreviated as ERSP) won the most seats. Other parties represented included the Popular Front of Estonia, the Estonian Heritage Society and the Communist Party of Estonia. The permanent standing committee of the Congress of Estonia –  the Committee of Estonia – was chaired by Mr. Tunne Kelam.

In September 1991, a Constituent Assembly was formed of equal numbers of members of the Supreme Soviet and the Congress of Estonia to work out a new Constitution for the Republic.  The new constitution was approved by referendum in June 1992, using the constitution replacement process specified in the 1938 constitution as a matter of legal continuity of the Republic of Estonia.  Both the Congress of Estonia and the Supreme Soviet dissolved themselves in October 1992, with the swearing-in of the first parliament (Riigikogu) elected under the new constitution in September 1992.

Politics 

March 1990 also saw the election of the Estonian Supreme Soviet, the first multi-party national elections in the Estonian SSR. Unlike the previous Soviet, which consisting largely of members of the Communist Party of Estonia, the new Supreme Council, as it had now begun to call itself, was dominated by the Estonian Popular Front.

The main distinctions between the political ideas of the Congress of Estonia and the Supreme Soviet were:

 The Congress of Estonia stood for the principle of legal continuity of the Republic, in contrast to the "Third Republic" concept (after the First Republic of 1918–1940 and the Soviet Republic of 1940–1991), which was the Supreme Soviet's dominant position;
 The Congress of Estonia, as the Citizens Committees before it, supported continuity in citizenship, as opposed to extending citizenship to all people with residential registrations (called propiska in Russian) in Estonia in 1990 (sometimes called the 'zero option citizenship' or 'clean state citizenship'), including more than 300,000 occupation-era migrants from the neighboring Soviet Union.

Opposition on issues of substance between the Congress of Estonia and the Supreme Soviet over the first point was the primary reason that the Supreme Soviet did not "proclaim" or "establish" Estonia's independence during the 1991 August Putsch in Russia, but instead, as a compromise, decided to reaffirm it instead. In later discussions, the Congress of Estonia prevailed regarding the aforementioned points.

A small number of the members of the Congress of Estonia were Estonians who had gone into exile during World War II, or children of such refugees. Some of the delegates from the United States commented on the similarity of the Citizens Committees of Estonia and Latvia (in the nineties, the Latvians had a movement analogous to the Estonian committees) to the American Committees of Correspondence, which were shadow governments organized by the patriot leaders of the Thirteen Colonies on the eve of the American Revolution. The American Committees of Correspondence played an important role in the events that led to the formation of the United States of America.

Later developments

After the adoption of the new Constitution in 1992, a new Citizenship Law recognised the citizenship registrations of the Citizens' Committees as the initial legal registry of Estonian citizens.  Citizens of the Soviet Union who had filed applications with the Citizens Committees were enabled to be naturalised on the basis of a simplified procedure.

List of notable members 
 Jüri Estam
 Liia Hänni
 Kaido Kama
 Jaan Kaplinski 
 Tunne Kelam
 Mart Laar
 Marju Lauristin 
 Tiit Made
 Lennart Meri
 Lagle Parek
 Hain Rebas
 Vardo Rumessen
 Ain Saar
 Edgar Savisaar
 Enn Tarto
 Indrek Teder
 Jüri Toomepuu
 Lauri Vahtre
 Arvo Valton
 Trivimi Velliste
 Ülo Vooglaid

References

External links
 Estonia's Way to Freedom
 Independence Reclaimed, August 1991 – October 1992

Defunct unicameral legislatures
1989 in the Soviet Union
1990 elections in the Soviet Union
1990 elections in Europe
1989 in Estonia
1990 in Estonia
1990